WBAV-FM (101.9 MHz, "V 101.9") is an urban adult contemporary radio station serving the Charlotte metropolitan area (Metrolina). Owned by Beasley Broadcast Group, WBAV's studios and offices are on South Boulevard in Charlotte's South End.  In morning drive time, it carries the syndicated Steve Harvey Morning Show.

WBAV-FM has an effective radiated power (ERP) of 100,000 watts, the maximum for most American FM stations.  The transmitter is on Crowder's Mountain, along McSwain Groves Road in Gastonia (its city of license).  The station broadcasts using HD Radio technology.  It carries Smooth Jazz on its HD-2 subchannel.

History

WGNC-FM, WZXI and WLIT
The original call sign was WGNC-FM and it had a power of 11,100 watts, a fraction of its current output. It was locally owned by the McSwain Family. WGNC-FM was a full simulcast of co-owned WGNC 1450 AM. The stations normally ran a broadcast day of 5:00 AM to 12:00 midnight until the late 1970s, when it began operating 24 hours daily. WGNC-AM-FM were network affiliates of ABC.

In 1976, WGNC-FM broke off from its AM sister station's programming and began airing a soft adult contemporary format.  The call letters were changed to WZXI in 1978.  The station was one of three soft AC stations in the Charlotte radio market.  Protests over the programming change were launched by WEZC in December 1982.  That led WZXI to change to beautiful music.

In 1987, WZXI became WLIT and later switched to a satellite-delivered Middle of the Road (MOR) format.

WCKZ
On January 22, 1988, shortly after Beasley Broadcasting bought the station, WLIT became WCKZ, better known as "Kiss 102". "Kiss" aired a "Rhythmic Contemporary Hit Radio" format (commonly known as "CHURban," a precursor to what is today Rhythmic Contemporary).  Artists included Lionel Richie, Shalamar, Whitney Houston, Lisa Lisa, Phil Collins and Jody Watley. The station also increased its transmitter's power on Crowder's Mountain and moved its studio from Gastonia to Charlotte. 

However, due to rival WPEG's increase in power, as well as increased competition from WAQQ, the station began falling in the ratings.  That, along with financial troubles, resulted in the station filing for bankruptcy in 1992.  In late 1993, Beasley announced it would sell WCKZ to Broadcasting Partners Inc. (BPI), which recently purchased WPEG.  A local group, Citizens for Broadcasting in the Public Interest, started a petition to stop the sale, but the sale was approved in mid-January 1994. BPI decided to merge WCKZ's rhythmic format with WPEG in order to eliminate the competition between the two stations. (The "Kiss-FM" moniker, with a more Mainstream Top 40 format, was relaunched on 95.1 FM in May 1996.)

WBAV-FM
On January 24, 1994, at 2 p.m., WCKZ flipped to Urban AC, branded as "V 101.9." New WBAV-FM call letters were adopted on January 24. (The WBAV call letters were assigned on February 11 to co-owned station WGIV.  Following a format change, the AM station returned to the WGIV call letters in May 1997.)

Broadcasting Partners merged with Evergreen Media in May 1995.  In December 1996, as part of a multi-market swap, WBAV-FM, along with Evergreen's four other Charlotte stations, were traded to EZ Communications (owners of WSOC-FM and WSSS.  WRFX then went to SFX Broadcasting, with Evergreen receiving EZ Communications' Philadelphia stations WIOQ and WUSL in return.  In July, EZ Communications was bought by American Radio Systems. ARS was bought out by Infinity Broadcasting on September 19, 1997.  Infinity changed its name to CBS Radio in December 2005 as part of the spin-off of CBS' motion picture and cable television assets under a relaunched Viacom.

On January 22, 2004, WBAV-FM dropped the syndicated Tom Joyner morning show.  That program moved to WQNC.

WBAV-FM was one of only three Urban Adult Contemporary stations owned by CBS Radio, the other two being KTWV in Los Angeles and the now defunct WJBW/WNEW-FM/WUUB in West Palm Beach. Charlotte was also the only market where CBS Radio operated two full-powered urban stations, WBAV-FM and WPEG. On October 2, 2014, CBS Radio announced that it would trade all of the company's Tampa and Charlotte stations (including WBAV), as well as WIP in Philadelphia to the Beasley Broadcast Group in exchange for five stations located in Miami and Philadelphia. The swap was completed on December 1, 2014. The trade brought the 101.9 frequency back to its former owners for the first time since 1993.

References

External links
WBAV-FM Website

BAV-FM
BAV-FM
Radio stations established in 1947
Urban adult contemporary radio stations in the United States
1947 establishments in North Carolina
BAV-FM